The Paunsaugunt Plateau (pronounced "PAWN-suh-gant") is a dissected plateau, rising to an elevation of , in southwestern Utah in the United States.

It is drained by the East Fork Sevier River which flows northward on the plateau, to the meet the main branch (Sevier River) which flows in a valley along the western side of the plateau. The plateau is highly dissected along the eastern flank, which is drained by the Paria River in the Colorado River watershed, and is protected as Bryce Canyon National Park. A section of the Great Basin Divide is along the plateau, and much of the plateau is part of Dixie National Forest. Utah's Highway 12, an All-American Road, crosses the Paunsaugunt Plateau.

Geologically the plateau was created approximately 10-20 million years ago by an uplift on the larger Colorado Plateau. The uplifting caused the formation of joints along the side of the plateau. Subsequent erosive forces, especially along the eastern side in Bryce Canyon National Park, have resulted in the creation of strange rock formations called hoodoos which are the hallmark of the park.

See also
Geology of the Bryce Canyon area

External links
Geology of Bryce Canyon National Park from the National Park Service
Hoodoos of Bryce Canyon
Brief description and view of Paunsaugunt Plateau
Paunsaugunt OHV Trail

Bryce Canyon
Colorado Plateau
Landforms of the Great Basin
Plateaus of Utah
Landforms of Garfield County, Utah
Landforms of Kane County, Utah